Betsakotsako Andranotsara is a commune in northern Madagascar. It belongs to the district of Andapa, which is a part of Sava Region. According to 2001 census the population of Betsakotsako Andranotsara was 6,314.

Only primary schooling is available in town. The majority 98.5% of the population are farmers.  The most important crop is rice, while other important products are coffee and vanilla.  Services provide employment for 1.5% of the population.

References and notes 

Populated places in Sava Region